Nyírtelek is a town in Szabolcs-Szatmár-Bereg county, in the Northern Great Plain region of eastern Hungary.

History
The town was separated from Nyíregyháza and became an independent settlement in January 1952 under the name Sőrekút. It was renamed to its current name still in that year, in November 1952.

Geography

Nyirtelek.hu

Populated places in Szabolcs-Szatmár-Bereg County